The 2017–18 Coupe de France preliminary rounds, Auvergne-Rhône-Alpes are football competitions.

First round 
The matches in Auvergne-Rhône-Alpes were played on 18, 19 and 20 August 2017.

First round results: Auvergne-Rhône-Alpes

Second round 
These matches were played between 26 August and 3 September 2017.

Second round results: Auvergne-Rhône-Alpes

Third round 
These matches were played on 7 and 8 October 2017.

Fifth round results: Auvergne-Rhône-Alpes

Fourth round 
These matches were played on 23 and 24 September 2017.

Fourth round results: Auvergne-Rhône-Alpes

Fifth round 
These matches were played on 7 and 8 October 2017.

Fifth round results: Auvergne-Rhône-Alpes

Sixth round 
These matches were played on 21 and 22 October 2017.

Sixth round results: Auvergne-Rhône-Alpes

References 

2017 in France
2018 in France
2017 in French sport
2018 in French sport